A - B - C - D - E - F - G - H - I - J - K - L - M - N - O - P - Q - R - S - T - U - V - W - XYZ

This is a list of rivers in the United States that have names starting with the letter D.  For the main page, which includes links to listings by state, see List of rivers in the United States.

D - Da 
D River - Oregon
Damariscotta River - Maine
Dan River - Virginia, North Carolina
Dan Hole River - New Hampshire
Davis Creek - West Virginia
Days River - Michigan

De - Di 
Dead River - several in Florida
Dead River - Maine
Dead River - New Hampshire
Dead River - New Jersey
Dead Diamond River - New Hampshire
Dead Moose River - Minnesota
Dearborn River - Montana
Deep River - North Carolina
Deep Fork River - Oklahoma
Deer River - Michigan
Deer River - New Hampshire
Deerfield River - Vermont, Massachusetts
Deerskin River - Wisconsin
Delaware River - New York, New Jersey, Pennsylvania, Delaware
Delaware River - Kansas
Delta River - Alaska
Des Lacs River - North Dakota
Des Moines River - Minnesota, Iowa
Des Plaines River - Wisconsin, Illinois
Deschutes River - Oregon
Deschutes River - Washington
Deshka River - Alaska
Detroit River - Michigan
Devils River - Michigan
Devils River - Texas
Devils River - Wisconsin
Dillons Run - West Virginia
Dirty Devil River - Utah
Dix River - Kentucky

Do - Dr 
Doe River - Tennessee
Dog River - Alabama
Dog River - Oregon
Dog Salmon River - Alaska
Dolores River - Colorado, Utah
Donner und Blitzen River - Oregon
Dosewallips River - Washington
Dowagiac River - Michigan
Doyles River - Virginia
Draanjik River - Alaska
Drakes River - New Hampshire
Driftwood River - Indiana
Dry Fork of the Cheat River - West Virginia
Dry Fork of the Tug Fork - West Virginia, Virginia
Dry River - New Hampshire
Dry Wolf Creek - Montana

Du 
Duck Creek - Ohio
Duck River - Alabama
Duck River - Tennessee
Duckabush River - Washington
Dugdemona River - Louisiana
Dungeness River - Washington
DuPage River - Illinois
Dupuyer Creek - Montana
Duwamish River - Washington

D